Vice Admiral Ravneet Singh, PVSM, AVSM, NM is a former flag officer in the Indian Navy. He last served as the Deputy Chief of the Naval Staff. He assumed office from Vice Admiral Murlidhar Sadashiv Pawar on 1 June 2021 following his retirement. Previously, he served as the Chief of Personnel (COP) and as the Director General Project Seabird.  He has also served as the Flag Officer Commanding Western Fleet from October 2015 to October 2016.

Early life and education
Singh was born in Jalandhar, Punjab, India. He graduated from the National Defence Academy, Pune.

Naval career 
Singh was commissioned into the Indian Navy on 1 July 1983. Trained as a Naval aviator, he completed the Flying Instructors course at the Flying Instructors School in Tambaram Air Force Station, the staff course at the Defence Services Staff College in Wellington and the Harrier Conversion Course at RAF Wittering in United Kingdom. He has also attended the Project Management Programme at Indian Institute of Management Ahmedabad.

Since he is a naval aviator, Singh has also commanded the Naval air squadrons INAS 300 and INAS 551. He has also commanded the premier Naval Air Base INS Hansa. Singh has also served as the executive officer of the Durg-class corvette  and the Delhi-class Guided missile destroyer .

Singh is a fighter pilot and a Qualified Flying Instructor with Master Green Instrument rating. He has over 2500 flying hours on 10 different type of aircraft. As a commander, when serving as a pilot on board , he was awarded the Nao Sena Medal for gallantry. He has also served as the Indian Defence Advisor in Kenya, Tanzania and Seychelles.

Flag rank
On promotion to Flag Rank, Singh took over as the Assistant Controller Carrier Project (ACCP) at Naval HQ. He served as the Assistant Controller Warship Production & Acquisition (ACWP&A) when the Aircraft Carrier INS Vikramaditya was inducted and commissioned. Singh then dual-hatted as the Flag Officer Goa Area (FOGA) and Flag Officer Naval Aviation (FONA).

Singh assumed the office of the Flag Officer Commanding Western Fleet on 12 October 2015, from Vice Admiral R. Hari Kumar. For his command of the Western Fleet, he was awarded the Ati Vishisht Seva Medal on 26 January 2017. Singh then served as the Chief of Staff of the Western Naval Command and as the Director General Project Seabird. On 2 December 2019, Singh took over as the Chief of Personnel, a Principal Staff Officer (PSO) appointment at Naval HQ and served till 31 May 2021. He is succeeded by Vice Admiral Dinesh K Tripathi .

He took over as Deputy Chief of Naval Staff on 1 June 2021.

Awards and decorations

See also
 Flag Officer Commanding Western Fleet
 Western Fleet

References

Bibliography

Indian Navy admirals
Deputy Chiefs of Naval Staff (India)
Flag Officers Commanding Western Fleet
Recipients of the Ati Vishisht Seva Medal
National Defence Academy (India) alumni
Living people
Year of birth missing (living people)
Chiefs of Personnel (India)
Indian naval aviators
Recipients of the Param Vishisht Seva Medal
Recipients of the Nau Sena Medal
Indian naval attachés
Defence Services Staff College alumni